St. Joseph's Degree College, located in Kurnool, India, is governed by St. Joseph's Educational Society and registered under the Societies Registration Act XXI of 1860 in 1967.

St. Joseph's Degree College is a self-financed college, without grant-in-aid.

References

External links

Colleges in Andhra Pradesh
Universities and colleges in Kurnool district
Christian schools in Andhra Pradesh
1967 establishments in Andhra Pradesh
Educational institutions established in 1967